Windmill is a solitaire card game played with two decks of playing cards; it is a relatively mechanical game that isn't won that frequently. It is so called because of its distinctive initial layout, which resembles a windmill's sails.   It is also known under the name Propeller.

Rules

Set-up

 First, an ace is placed at the center. Then eight cards are placed around in such a way that the layout looks like a cross. The ace forms the primary foundation and the eight cards form the reserve. The gaps at the corner of the "sails" are reserved for kings and form the secondary foundations. The suits of the kings to be placed on the secondary foundations are disregarded. The object of the game is to build the primary  foundation up to king with 52 cards in it and the secondary foundations down to ace with 13 cards each in them. All foundations are built regardless of suit.

The illustration below shows how the tableau is initially laid out. (A) is for the primary foundation, R for the reserve (8 free cells) and (K) for the secondary foundations, empty at first.

Game-play

The game starts by moving cards from the reserve to either the primary foundation or, if available, to one of the secondary foundations. Gaps in the reserve must be immediately filled by cards from the wastepile or, if the wastepile is empty, from the stock. If no more moves are possible from the reserve, the player deals cards from the stock one at a time to the wastepile, searching for playable cards. The player may also move the top card of a secondary foundation to the primary foundation, provided that the next card to be placed on the primary foundation comes from either the wastepile or the reserve.

When the primary foundation reaches a king, an ace can be placed over it. But when a secondary foundation reaches an ace, it can longer be built unless the ace is moved to the primary foundation.

The game is won when all cards are in the foundations: 52 on the primary foundation and 13 on each of the four secondary foundations.

Variations

There is also an alternate variation wherein the direction of building on the primary and secondary foundations is reversed. In this variation, the primary foundation starts with a laid-out king and is built down while the secondary foundations start with the first available aces and are built up.

References

See also
 List of solitaire games
 Glossary of solitaire terms

Double-deck patience card games
Reserved builders